Daniel Gregorio "Danny" Romero Jr. (born July 12, 1974) is an American former professional boxer who competed between 1992 and 2006. He is a world champion in two weight classes, having held the IBF flyweight title from 1995 to 1996 and the IBF junior bantamweight title from 1996 to 1997.

Professional career
Romero's first fight as a professional was on September 14, 1992, when he knocked out Raul Hernandez in the first round at Phoenix, Arizona. His first eight bouts all took place in the Phoenix area, and he won all, seven by knockout. His first fight outside Phoenix was on April 13, 1993, when he knocked out Alberto Cantu in three rounds at Bay St. Louis, Mississippi. On May 22 of that year, he had his first professional fight in his hometown, Albuquerque New Mexico USA, knocking out Silverio Porras in two rounds.

Romero won five more bouts in a row, including a victory over former Alex Sanchez world title challenger Orlando Malone, before having his first chance to fight for a belt: On May 5, 1994, he knocked out Brian Lonon in two rounds to win the NABF regional Flyweight title.
He retained the title four times, and added three non-title victories, before challenging for a world championship for the first time. On April 22, 1995, he became the IBF's world Flyweight champion with a twelve round unanimous decision over Francisco Tejedor, at the MGM Grand Arena, in Las Vegas. He defended the title once, then faced the unheralded Willy Salazar in a non-title bout, on September 8. Romero suffered a 7th round TKO loss to Salazar, in what Ring Magazine heralded as the "upset of the year" for 1995. In that fight he was ahead on all score cards before having the fight stopped due to an eye injury.  He bounced back with a first round knockout victory over former WBO world Flyweight champion Jose Quirino.

Romero then decided to move up in weight division, to the Super Flyweight division. After one win in that division, he was given a chance at his second world championship. On August 24, 1996, Romero knocked out Colombian Harold Grey in two rounds to conquer his second world title. Even as he had lost to Salazar previously, interest in a fight between Romero and Johnny Tapia began to increase.

After winning two more fights, both times Romero retaining his world title by knockout, Romero and Tapia met to unify the IBF and WBO world Super Flyweight championships. On July 18, 1997, the long-awaited bout finally took place, with Tapia winning a close twelve round unanimous decision.

Romero won three fights in a row, then lost, on Halloween night, 1998 to Vuyani Bungu by a twelve round decision in an attempt to win a title in a third division, this time the IBF Super-Bantamweight title.

Romero would go on to win ten of his next twelve bouts, including a first round knockout over former world champion Rodolfo Blanco and a sixth round knockout over the respected Famosito Gomez. On September 27, 2002, Danny fought Cruz Carbajal but the fight was stopped by Romero's trainer, former world champion Eddie Mustafa Muhammad after round four due to an injury suffered in the first round.

On May 23, 2003,  in front of his hometown crowd following a twelve round unanimous decision win over Trinidad Mendoza gave him his third world title in three different weight classes, winning the IBA's Super-Bantamweight title.

Other achievements
Romero does occasional television jobs, specifically for the Showtime boxing network as well as commercials and movies.
Developed his own promotional company called "Danny Romero Productions."  The company promotes shows of any kind and currently has professional fighters signed to the company.  A private boxing gym was purchased to provide his fighters with elite training.  The gym prepares Danny as well as his pro fighters for possible upcoming events.

Comeback
Romero Jr.'s father was stricken with a rare liver disorder, a form of cirrhosis that would kill him without a transplant.  Inspired by his father's battle, Romero Jr. returned to the ring and, fighting for the first time in two years, was held to a majority draw by Alex Ali Baba (21-7-1) in an eight-round junior featherweight fight.

Professional boxing record

See also
List of flyweight boxing champions
List of super-flyweight boxing champions

References

External links

1974 births
Living people
Flyweight boxers
Super-flyweight boxers
Bantamweight boxers
Super-bantamweight boxers
World flyweight boxing champions
World super-flyweight boxing champions
International Boxing Federation champions
Boxers from Albuquerque, New Mexico
American boxers of Mexican descent
American male boxers